Rudolf Fizir (13 January 1891 – 11 November 1960) was an airplane constructor. He designed at least 18 original planes, some conversions of landplanes to seaplanes - and a parachute.

Fizir was born in Ludbreg, a small town on the river Bednja, in the north of Croatia. In 1914, whilst still a senior student, he was offered his first job in Schwerin, where he worked in the construction of fighter aircraft for the German Fliegerkorps in the new Fokker-Flugzeugbau factory. From there he was sent to Budapest, in order to find and organize a Fokker subsidiary.

Between 1918 and 1920, Fizir was employed in the automobile industry, where he gathered experience with internal combustion engines. In 1920 he returned to Ludbreg, and then moved to Petrovaradin. There he started to build his aircraft designs in his yard, at his own expense.

With a biplane, which Fizir built in 1925, he won the first prize in the 1927 Little Entente contest, despite having an engine with only half the power of other competing designs. Other aircraft he produced were named after the engines used, such as the Fizir-Mercedes, Fizir-Wright, Fizir-Titan, Fizir-Kastor, Fizir-Gypsi, and the half-metallic Fizir-Jupiter. His successful designs, almost all wooden, were economic to produce, reflecting the low economic power of the pre-World War II Kingdom of Yugoslavia, wartime Croatia (Independent State of Croatia) and post-World War II Yugoslavia, and were highly regarded in Germany and France throughout the 1930s, 40s and 50s. He had a strong affiliation for trainers and seaplanes, having a vision of connecting the Adriatic islands with a regular seaplane service.

His greatest success was the Fizir FN two-seater with dual controls, over 100 of which were built, which was in use as a trainer up to 30 years after World War II. After World War II, Fizir worked as a motorcycle designer, and continued with aircraft construction in his retirement years.

The road leading to Zagreb Airport was named in his honour.

References

External links

 https://web.archive.org/web/20070203162457/http://library.thinkquest.org/C0127004/TQnovo/engilsh/other_inventors/other_sixteen.htm
 https://web.archive.org/web/20070203091206/http://library.thinkquest.org/C0127004/TQnovo/izumi/izumiostali_sesnaesti.htm 

1891 births
1960 deaths
People from Ludbreg
People from the Kingdom of Croatia-Slavonia
Aircraft designers
Aviation pioneers
Croatian engineers
Croatian Home Guard personnel
Engineers from Zagreb
Burials at Mirogoj Cemetery
Yugoslav engineers